Chinghla Mong Chowdhury Mari (29 September 1938 – 10 May 2012), simply known as Mari Chowdhury, was a Bangladeshi football player who played as a left-winger. He is considered to be the best East Pakistani footballer of all time, and one of the few to play for the Pakistan national football team. Although most of his goals are unregistered, Mari is the unrecognised all-time top scorer in both Dhaka League and Bangladeshi top-tier football history with 234 goals.

Early life
Mari was born in Chandraghona, Rangamati, on 29 September 1938. As his father died when he was young, his mother took care of him. Mari's father, Thysau Chowdhury, was a son of the Bomang royal family, but was expelled from the royal family for accepting Christianity. Mari was the youngest in a family of three brothers and one sister.

Mari's school life began at the Baptist Mission Boys School in Barishal. In 1951, Mari played for Firingi Bazar in the Chittagong League while still in the ninth grade. Mari did his HSC from Jagannath University, in 1956 and finished his studies from the same University in 1959.

Career
Mari's first club was the Port Trust of Chittagong, he then went on to join Calcutta Football League side, East Bengal Railway in 1951. Mari caught the attention of India while playing in the IFA Shield in 1952. He made his Dhaka League breakthrough with Fire Service SC, in 1953. In the same year, he joined East Pakistan Railway, and partook in the Ronald Shield held in Dhaka. Mari won his first Dhaka League title in 1954, with Dhaka Wanderers and by 1956 he completed a hat-trick of league triumphs with the club. The same year, he was one of the two Bengali footballers who got a place in the Pakistan national football team, with the other being Nabi Chowdhury. He played two friendlies against Singapore and Ceylon. In 1957, the famous East Pakistani attacking trio of Kabir Ahmed-Ashraf Chowdhury-Mari won Mohammedan SC its first  league title. 

In the 1957 Pakistan National Championship, the East Pakistan White team led by Mari finished runners-up, losing 2–1 in the final. Mari was named the best player of the tournament. In 1959, Mari again wore the armband for Pakistan White team and finally in 1960 the team managed to win the National Championship. He played for Dhaka Jagannath College in 1957–58 and won the Sir AF Rahman Shield and Governors Cup for them. Mari suffered a leg pain while playing in the 1958 Asian Games in Tokyo, Japan. As a result, he walked away from the national team, however, he continued to play in the domestic league for another decade. Played in Mohammedan SC, Dhaka Wanderers and EPIDC the latter being his final club in 1967. After the Independence of Bangladesh, he served as the head coach for Team BJMC (formerly EPIDC), Bangladesh Government Press and Bangladesh Trading Corporation. In 1982, he guided BRTC FC to promotion from the Second Division.

Personal life and legacy
Mari, was also involved in other sports, in 1954, he won gold in high jump and silver in 100m sprint at the National Olympics for Pakistan. Mari was a regular member of the East Pakistan Volleyball team and also captained the side.

Apart from football, during the Bangladesh Liberation War in 1971, he served as the captain of Sector 1 in Agartala and later as Quartermaster under Major Ziaur Rahman, for nine months.

Mari received the National Sports Awards, in 1981.

In 2001, Mari was given a special award as the Best Footballer from the Rangamati Hill District Council.

On 9 May 2012, Mari passed away, while being admitted at the Holy Family Hospital. He had been suffering from Alzheimer’s since 2008, and also had skin cirrhoses, which forced him to be hospitalised. He left behind a wife and three sons

In 2012, the National Sports Council changed the name of the Rangamati Stadium to Ching Lah Mong Chowdhury Murruy Rangamati Stadium, to commemorate the late footballer.

In February 2020, a mural of the Mari was innagurated  in Rangamati.

Honours

Player
Dhaka Wanderers Club
Dhaka League = 1954, 1955, 1956, 1960

Mohammedan SC
Dhaka League = 1957

EPIDC
Dhaka League = 1967

East Pakistan White
Pakistan National Championship : 1960

Manager
BRTC Football Club
Dhaka Second Division League : 1982

Awards and accolades
1981 − National Sports Awards

Bibliography
পাকিস্তান জাতীয় দল বাঙালি খেলোয়াড় (Bengali players in the Pakistan national team)

References

1938 births
2012 deaths
Bangladeshi footballers
Pakistani footballers
Pakistan international footballers
Mohammedan SC (Dhaka) players
Team BJMC players
People from Rangamati District
Association football wingers
Bangladeshi football managers
Asian Games competitors for Pakistan
Footballers at the 1958 Asian Games
Calcutta Football League players
Recipients of the Bangladesh National Sports Award
Mukti Bahini personnel